Fuzzy Logic is the debut album by the Welsh rock band Super Furry Animals. Recorded at Rockfield Studios in Wales, and released on the Creation label in May 1996, it was positively received by critics, who felt it was an eclectic if inconsistent mix of psychedelic music and glam rock, and was included in Q Magazine's list of recordings of the year. It has retained a modest respect among some critics; it was listed in Q'''s "Best British Albums Ever" in July 2004, and is included in the book 1001 Albums You Must Hear Before You Die. It contains two top 20 hits in "If You Don't Want Me to Destroy You" and "Something 4 the Weekend"; it also contains the singles "God! Show Me Magic" and "Hometown Unicorn". It reached number 23 in the UK Albums Chart on release. In 2013, NME ranked it at number 245 in its list of the 500 Greatest Albums of All Time.

Recording
In a 2008 interview with Uncut Gruff Rhys described the process of making the album:

Although the album was conceived as a reaction to Britpop which the band felt represented a "conservative backwards movement in music" they soon realised that they were in an "old 70's studio making [a] 70's rock album".  Former members Rhys Ifans and Dic Ben contributed to the track "Long Gone" by leaving an answerphone message which plays as the song comes to a close.

The album cover is a montage of photos of Welsh-born drug smuggler Howard Marks, the subject of the song "Hangin' with Howard Marks". Marks visited Rockfield during the making of the album at the band's request.

Reception

Reviewing Fuzzy Logic in 1996 for NME, Simon Williams commented that debut albums "rarely come as multi-layered, as lovingly-manipulated as this". A rave review in Alternative Press praised the album as "the stuff of which fearless dreams are forged". Jon Wiederhorn of Rolling Stone felt it was "rich in hallucinogenic spirit and shimmering guitars" and invoked the spirit of early 1970s pop music. James Delingpole in a January 1997 review in The Daily Telegraph wrote the band had produced a "strange mix of Bowie-esque glam rock, school-of-Syd-Barrett psychedelia and DIY kitsch", which resulted in a "delightfully skewed" album. Stephen Thomas Erlewine of AllMusic later commented that on Fuzzy Logic, the band combined psychedelia and art rock with pop melodies in an "intoxicating" manner, and that despite not being fully cohesive as an album, "the individual pleasures of each song become more apparent with each listen". Fuzzy Logic was named the third best album of 1996 by Melody Maker and fourth best by NME. The album was also included in Q magazine's list of recordings of the year.Fuzzy Logic reached number 23 in the UK Albums Chart on release.

Legacy
In a June 2005 Pitchfork review of the 2005 reissue, Marc Hogan felt the album was a good introduction to the band's "candy-factory chameleon act" with music styles including "synth-laced punk-pop", "slanted pop" and "Pipers-era Floyd", despite its inconsistency. Rod Stanley in the 2005 book 1001 Albums You Must Hear Before You Die felt that the band would go on to record better albums, but that the inventiveness of the album's blend of "Sixties pop, punk rock, and psychedelia, with an underlying Nineties dance sensibility", made it both joyful and exciting. Reviewing the album in 2016, Uncuts John Lewis wrote that its "quizzical" lyrics and influences from "1970s guilty pleasures" set Super Furry Animals apart from their contemporaries in the 1990s Britpop scene.

In 1999, critic Ned Raggett ranked Fuzzy Logic at number 74 on his list of "The Top 136 or So Albums of the Nineties" for Freaky Trigger. Fuzzy Logic was listed at number 42 in Qs 2004 list of the "50 Best British Albums Ever". In 2017, Pitchfork ranked the album at number 27 on its list of the 50 best Britpop albums. In 2013, NME'' ranked it at number 245 in its list of the 500 Greatest Albums of All Time.

Track listing

The American release replaces "Something for the Weekend" with the longer single version of the song known as "Something 4 the Weekend".

Personnel
Super Furry Animals
Gruff Rhys – vocals, guitars, analogues, claps
Dafydd Ieuan – drums, percussion, vocals, piano, claps
Cian Ciaran – keyboards, analogues, vocals, claps
Guto Pryce – bass, Hammond, vocals, claps, analogues
Huw Bunford – guitars, vocals, e-bow, cello, claps

Additional musicians
Gorwel Owen – piano, Hammond, Rhodes
Jez Francis – piano on "God! Show Me Magic"
Matthew Everett – violin
Chris Williams – violin
Helen Spargo – viola
Catherine Tanner – cello
Martin Smith – trumpet, tenor horn
Simon James – saxophone, flute
Andrew Frizell – saxophone, recorder, trombone
Lindsay Higgs – balalaika
Rhys Ifans & Dic Ben – answering machine message on "Long Gone"

Technical personnel
SFA – songs, production
Gorwel Owen – production
Andy Wilkinson – engineering
Nick Brine – assistance
Brian Cannon @ Microdot – design, art direction
Toby Egelnick – inside design, layout

References

External links

Fuzzy Logic (Adobe Flash) at Radio3Net (streamed copy where licensed)
Fuzzy Logic (Adobe Flash) at Myspace (streamed copy where licensed)

Super Furry Animals albums
1996 debut albums
Creation Records albums
Albums produced by Gorwel Owen
Albums recorded at Rockfield Studios
Art rock albums by Welsh artists
Glam rock albums by Welsh artists
Punk rock albums by Welsh artists